The Niterói circus fire occurred on December 17, 1961 in the city of Niterói, Brazil. A fire in the tent housing a sold-out performance by the Gran Circus Norte-Americano caused more than 500 deaths. It is the worst fire disaster to occur in Brazil.

Circus
The Gran Circus Norte-Americano premiered in Niterói on December 15, 1961. It was advertised as the most complete circus in Latin America, with approximately 60 performers, 20 other employees and 150 animals. Circus owner Danilo Stevanovich had purchased a new tent made of nylon and weighing six tons. The circus arrived in Niterói one week before the premiere, and was set up in the Praça Expedicionário in the city center. The circus tent imported from India had been advertised as being made of nylon, but was actually cotton treated with paraffin wax, a highly flammable material.

Fire
The fire occurred with 3,000 people present under the big top, and during the trapeze act. One of the artists later recounted that she had been waiting on the platform for her partner who was on the trapeze when she spotted the fire. In an effort not to make him fall she waited until he landed on the platform before alerting him, and they jumped into the net under them and escaped the tent. There was at least one reported instance of a Boy Scout in attendance using a pocket knife to slit the walls of the tent open to make another exit. In a little over five minutes, the circus was completely devoured by the flames. 

All of the circus' 150 animals were rescued and none had been under the big top at the time of the fire, although three elephants broke from their chains and escaped.

Victims 
Of all the casualties, 372 died immediately, with the total reaching 503 dead as others succumbed to their injuries. About 70% of the victims were children, with many eyewitnesses raising claims that the children had been trampled to death by adults attempting to escape the circus tent. 

Treatment for the injured was hampered due to short supply of many different treatments and even hospital beds and medical personnel. Many supplies were air-lifted from Rio de Janeiro and São Paulo, and doctors and nurses traveled from larger towns after an appeal on the radio.

Investigation
The fire was soon claimed to have been caused by arson. Three people were arrested and convicted of starting the fire. Independent investigations and opinions point to electrical problems that were covered up.

Aftermath 
Three days of mourning were declared along with a state of calamity for the area. Brazilian President João Goulart inspected the scene of the fire and authorized federal aid for the victims. The owner of the circus also hoped to organize benefit performances for families of victims.

See also

Hartford circus fire
Kiss nightclub fire
1981 Bangalore circus fire

References

1961 fires in South America
1961 in Brazil
Fires in Brazil
Arson in Brazil
Niterói
Circus disasters
December 1961 events in South America